This is a list of dictionaries considered authoritative or complete by approximate number of total words, or headwords, included.  These figures do not take account of entries with senses for different word classes (such as noun and adjective) and homographs. Although it is possible to count the number of entries in a dictionary, it is not possible to count the number of words in a language. In compiling a dictionary, a lexicographer decides whether the evidence of use is sufficient to justify an entry in the dictionary. This decision is not the same as determining whether the word exists.

The green background means a given dictionary is the largest in a given language.

Notes

References

 Number of words
Lexicography
Linguistics lists

Lists by size